Hizzonner is an American television sitcom that aired on NBC on Thursday nights from May 10 to June 14, 1979.

Synopsis
The series centered on Mayor Cooper, a widower with two grown children, Annie, a civil rights attorney, and James, a hippie.

An aspect of the series is that when things would get out of hand, Mayor Cooper would break into song and there was always a musical number in each episode.

Episode list

Cast
 David Huddleston as Mayor Cooper
 Will Seltzer as James Cooper
 Kathy Cronkite as Annie Cooper
 Don Galloway as Donald Timmons
Diana Muldaur as Ginny
Gina Hecht as Melanie
 Mickey Deems as Nails

See also
Hizzoner

References

External links
 

1979 American television series debuts
1979 American television series endings
NBC original programming
English-language television shows
1970s American sitcoms
1970s American political comedy television series
Television shows set in Wisconsin